Ağdərə (also, Agdara, Agdere, and Akdere) is a village and municipality in the Khizi Rayon of Azerbaijan.  It has a population of 241.  The municipality consists of the villages of Ağdərə, Qasımkənd, Əmbizlər, and Tudar.

References 

Populated places in Khizi District